Femmilsjøen is a lake in Ny-Friesland at Spitsbergen, Svalbard. The glacier Longstaffbreen debouches into the lake at the eastern end. The western end of the lake is relatively close to Wijdefjorden.

References

Lakes of Spitsbergen